Ignacio Núñez Soler was a distinguished plastic artist. His work show high amount of social commitment, because he represents in it people from his hometown (Asunción) in scenes of day-to-day life, in squares and markets.

He was born in Asunción, Paraguay, on July 31, 1891, son of Adolfo R. Soler and Ascención Núñez, but he used Núñez Soler when signing his work (using the mother’s last name first before the father’s last name, contrary to what is custom in Paraguay), always being a rebel and nonconformist until his death at the age of 92 years.

Childhood and Youth

Since early age he was a passionate union man, and defended the rights of the workers. He did not paint artistically; he was a painter of houses.

But then he started to paint the staging of Julio Correa’s (creator of Guaraní theatre) theatre plays. Since then, he explored the plastic language and grew as an artist. He painted mostly houses, squares, the market “guazú”, the Uruguayan square, festivities and other folkloric scenes.

Ticio Escobar, critic and scholar in visual arts in Paraguaya writes about Soler: “The paintings of Ignacio are documents of narrative and meticulous character about Asunción in the first half of the 20th century, a city condemned by the chaos of a sudden modernization. But his testimony is entwined with personal anecdotes and a fresh but firm preoccupation for social matters and focused on the popular optics and a notable expressive looseness. These complex elements make the work of Núñez Soler a unique case in our plastic, his paintings should not be taken in account just because of the esthetic value but also as a part of the Paraguayan history that have not been previously recorded…”

Work

Since 1931 and for over half a century, he was present in several exhibitions, individually and collectively and also internationally, participating in the Biennial exhibitions of São Paulo, Brazil. Some of his paintings are in important museums of Argentina, Brazil, Uruguay, United States and Germany.

He married with Herminia Rosa Blanc and had children.

He died in Asunción, on October 13, 1983.

References
 Centro Cultural de la República El Cabildo 
 Diccionario Biográfico "FORJADORES DEL PARAGUAY", Primera Edición Enero de 2000. Distribuidora Quevedo de Ediciones. Buenos Aires, Argentina.

1891 births
1983 deaths
20th-century Paraguayan painters